Lysbotn Chapel is a chapel of the Church of Norway in Senja Municipality in Troms og Finnmark county, Norway. It is located south of the village of Lysnes on the eastern side of the island of Senja. It is an annex chapel for the Lenvik parish which is part of the Senja prosti (deanery) in the Diocese of Nord-Hålogaland. The white, wooden chapel was built in a fan-shaped style in 1970 using plans drawn up by the architect Gaute Baalsrud. The chapel seats about 120 people.

See also
List of churches in Nord-Hålogaland

References

Senja
Churches in Troms
Wooden churches in Norway
20th-century Church of Norway church buildings
Churches completed in 1970
1970 establishments in Norway
Fan-shaped churches in Norway